Sam Delahay (born 30 December 1979) is a former British judoka, who won a silver medal at the 2002 Commonwealth Games.

Judo career
At the 2002 Commonwealth Games in Manchester, Cousins won the silver medal in the under 100kg category, in the gold medal match he was defeated by Canada's Nicolas Gill.

He is a three times champion of Great Britain, winning the middleweight division at the British Judo Championships in 1997 and the half-heavyweight title in 2001 and 2002.

Personal life
His brother Joe Delahay is also a British judoka who was British champion at heavyweight in 2006.

References

External link

1979 births
Living people
English male judoka
Commonwealth Games silver medallists for England
Judoka at the 2002 Commonwealth Games
Commonwealth Games medallists in judo
Medallists at the 2002 Commonwealth Games